Admiral Sir Michael Howard Livesay,  (5 April 1936 – 6 October 2003) was a senior Royal Navy officer who served as Second Sea Lord and Chief of Naval Personnel from 1991 to 1992.

Naval career
Educated at Acklam Hall Grammar School and Royal Naval College Dartmouth, Livesay was commissioned into the Royal Navy in 1957. He was made Commanding Officer of the minesweeper HMS Hubberston in 1966 and of the frigate  in 1970. He went on to be Captain, Fishery Protection and Mine Counter Measures, based in Scotland in 1975, and the first Commander of the aircraft carrier  in 1979.

Livesay was Director of Naval Warfare at the Ministry of Defence during the Falklands War, during which he developed the "Rules of Engagement" and then, in 1984, went on to be Flag Officer Sea Training. He was appointed Assistant Chief of the Naval Staff in 1986 and Flag Officer Scotland and Northern Ireland in 1989. His final posting was as Second Sea Lord and Chief of Naval Personnel as well as President of the Royal Naval College, Greenwich in 1991; he retired in 1993.

In retirement Livesay became Chairman of the Northern Lighthouse Board and a Non-Executive Director of Scottish Nuclear. He lived at Auchterarder in Perthshire.

Family
In 1959 Livesay married to Sarah "Sally" House: they had two daughters.

References

|-

|-

|-

1936 births
2003 deaths
Royal Navy admirals
Knights Commander of the Order of the Bath
Admiral presidents of the Royal Naval College, Greenwich